Charles Hazlitt Upham,  (21 September 1908 – 22 November 1994) was a New Zealand soldier who was awarded the Victoria Cross (VC) twice during the Second World War - for gallantry in Crete in May 1941, and in Egypt, in July 1942. He was the most recent of only three people to receive the VC twice, the only one to receive two VCs during the Second World War and the only combat soldier to receive the award twice. As a result, Upham is often described as the most highly decorated Commonwealth soldier of that war, as the VC is the Commonwealth's highest award for gallantry in the face of the enemy.

Early life
Upham was born in Christchurch on 21 September 1908, the son of John Hazlitt Upham, a lawyer, and his wife, Agatha Mary Coates. His father was a great-grandson of artist John Hazlitt, while his mother was a granddaughter of pioneer colonist Guise Brittan. He boarded at Waihi School, near Winchester, South Canterbury, between 1917 and 1922 and at Christ's College, Christchurch, from 1923 to 1927. From an early age he was a quiet and unusually determined boy, and on more than one occasion he intervened to defend schoolmates who were being bullied.

Upham attended Canterbury Agricultural College (now known as Lincoln University), where he earned a diploma in agriculture in 1930. He worked first as a sheep farmer, later as manager, and then valuing farms for the New Zealand government. In 1937, he joined the Valuation Department as assistant district valuer in Timaru. The following year, he became engaged to Mary (Molly) Eileen McTamney (a distant relative of Noel Chavasse, VC and Bar). In 1939, he returned to Lincoln to complete a diploma in valuation and farm management.

Second World War
In September 1939, Upham enlisted in the 2nd New Zealand Expeditionary Force (2NZEF) at the age of 30, and was posted to the 20th Canterbury-Otago Battalion, part of the New Zealand 2nd Division. Although he already had five years experience in the New Zealand Army Territorial Force, in which he held the rank of sergeant, he signed on as a private. He was soon promoted to temporary lance corporal, but initially declined a place in an Officer Cadet Training Unit (OCTU). In December, he was promoted to sergeant and a week later sailed for Egypt. In July 1940, he was finally persuaded to join an OCTU.

First VC

In March 1941, Upham's battalion left for Greece and then withdrew to Crete, and it was here that he was wounded in the action, from 22 to 30 May 1941, that gained him his first VC. When informed of the award, his first response was "It's meant for the men."

Citation

Bar to VC
Upham was evacuated to Egypt, now promoted to captain. He received a Bar to his VC for his actions in July 1942, before and during the First Battle of El Alamein.

Citation

King George VI had invested Upham with his first Victoria Cross at Buckingham Palace on 11 May 1945. When the recommendation was made for a second VC, the King remarked to Major-General Howard Kippenberger that a bar to the cross would be "very unusual indeed" and enquired firmly, "Does he deserve it?" Kippenberger replied, "In my respectful opinion, sir, Upham won the VC several times over."

Colonel Burrows approached Kippenberger after the Minqar Qaim action and was already mooting the nomination for a second VC even before the battle at Ruweisat Ridge and Upham's capture. General Inglis received citations for both Minqar Qaim and Ruweisat that each individually suggested Upham merited the VC for either occasion independently, but because of the excessive rarity of multiple VC awards opted to combine the citations into the single one forwarded to the King.

With this award, Upham became the third man to be awarded a Bar to the VC. The previous recipients were Lieutenant Colonel Arthur Martin-Leake and Captain Noel Godfrey Chavasse, both doctors serving in the Royal Army Medical Corps. Martin-Leake received his VC for rescuing wounded under fire in the Second Boer War, and the Bar for similar actions in the First World War. Chavasse was similarly decorated for two such actions in the First World War, subsequently dying of wounds received during his second action. Neither of these men were combatants, so Upham remains the only fighting soldier to have been decorated with the VC and Bar.

Prisoner of war
After being taken prisoner of war (POW), he was sent to an Italian hospital where an Italian doctor recommended his wounded arm be amputated in view of their extremely scarce supplies and inability to prevent or treat gangrene. Upham refused. He knew that the operation would have to be carried out without anaesthetic and he had seen other patients dying in agony under surgery. He later had the wound dressed by an Allied POW doctor.

Upham refused on principle to escape from the hospital, but was branded "dangerous" after several later escape attempts.

One attempt occurred when POWs were being transported in open trucks through Italy. He had broken an ankle in jumping from the moving truck.

By the summer of 1943 Upham was a POW at Campo PG47, near Modena, in the River Po Valley.

On another occasion, he tried to escape a camp by climbing its fences in broad daylight. He became entangled in barbed wire when he fell down between the two fences. When a guard pointed a pistol at his head and threatened to shoot, Upham calmly ignored him and lit a cigarette. This scene was photographed by the Germans as "evidence" and later reprinted in a biography, Kenneth Sandford's Mark of the Lion.

After this incident, Upham was considered dangerous and was placed in solitary confinement. He was only allowed to exercise alone, while accompanied by two armed guards and while covered by a machine gun in a tower. Despite these precautions, Upham bolted from his little courtyard, straight through the German barracks and out through the front gate of the camp. The guard in the machine-gun tower later told other prisoners that he refrained from shooting Upham out of respect, and as he could see German soldiers coming up the road whom he expected to capture Upham. Upham was soon recaptured and sent to the infamous Oflag IV-C (Colditz) on 14 October 1944.

During his transfer on a civilian train while guarded by two Germans, Upham made his final escape attempt. Upham was only allowed to visit the toilet when the train was travelling at high speed to prevent him from jumping through a window. Nevertheless, Upham prised open the toilet window and jumped onto the tracks, knocking himself unconscious. After awakening, he escaped into a nearby orchard, but the even rows of trees and lack of undergrowth provided poor cover and he was recaptured after 12 hours.

At Colditz, there were few opportunities to escape. Upham and most of his fellow prisoners waited until Colditz was captured by Allied forces.

Aftermath
When Colditz Castle was captured by American forces, most of the inmates made their own way home immediately. Upham joined an American unit, was armed and equipped, and wanted to fight the Germans.

Upham was keen to see action again, but was instead sent to Britain where he was reunited with Molly McTamney, who was then serving as a nurse. They were married at New Milton, Hampshire, on 20 June 1945. He returned to New Zealand in early September, and she followed him in December.

Upham was also mentioned in despatches on 14 November 1946.

Post-war

After the war, Upham returned to New Zealand, and the community raised £10,000 to buy him a farm. However, he declined and the money went into the C. H. Upham Scholarship for children of ex-servicemen to study at Lincoln University or Canterbury College.

He obtained a war rehabilitation loan and bought a farm on Conway Flat, Hundalee, North Canterbury. It is said that for the remainder of his life, Upham would allow no German manufactured machinery or car onto his property.

Although somewhat hampered by his injuries, he became a successful farmer and served on the board of governors of Christ's College for nearly 20 years. He and Molly had three daughters, and lived on their farm until January 1994, when Upham's poor health forced them to retire to Christchurch.

Upham was surprised with an appearance on This Is Your Life in 1985.

He died in Canterbury on 22November 1994, surrounded by his wife and daughters. His funeral in the Christchurch Cathedral was conducted with full military honours. The streets of Christchurch were lined by over 5,000 people. Upham is buried in the graveyard of St Paul's Church Papanui. His death was also marked by a memorial service on 5 May 1995 in London's St Martin-in-the-Fields Church, attended by representatives for the Royal Family; senior New Zealand government and political figures; senior members of the British and New Zealand armed forces; Valerian Freyberg, 3rd Baron Freyberg, grandson of VC holder Lord Freyberg, the commander of Allied forces in Crete and 7th Governor-General of New Zealand; representatives of veterans' organisations; and other VC and George Cross holders.

Victoria Cross and Bar
In November 2006, Upham's VC and Bar were purchased from his daughters by the Imperial War Museum for an undisclosed sum. However, as New Zealand legislation prohibits the export of such historic items, the Imperial War Museum agreed to a permanent loan of the medals to the National Army Museum at Waiouru. On 2 December 2007, Upham's VC was among nine stolen from locked, reinforced glass cabinets at the museum. On 16 February 2008, the New Zealand Police announced all the medals had been recovered as a result of a NZ$300,000 reward offered by Michael Ashcroft and Tom Sturgess.

Other honours

In 1953, Upham was awarded the Queen Elizabeth II Coronation Medal. In 1992, he was presented with the Order of Honour by the Government of Greece, in recognition of his service in the Battles of Greece and Crete.

HMNZS Charles Upham, a Royal New Zealand Navy ship, was commissioned in 1995, and decommissioned in 2001.

A bronze statue stands outside the Hurunui District Council buildings in Amberley, North Canterbury, depicting Charles Upham "the observer".

A street in suburban Christchurch is named Charles Upham Avenue, and there is an Upham Terrace in Palmerston North, and an Upham Crescent in Taradale, Napier. There is also an Upham Street in Havelock North, Hawke's Bay, near streets named after fellow VC recipients Elliott, Grant, Crichton and Ngarimu.

A Jetconnect Boeing 737-800 was named Charles Upham in August 2011.

In popular culture
Charles Upham is the subject of Tom Scott's book Searching for Charlie: In Pursuit of the Real Charles Upham VC & Bar.
The character of Lucas Riggs in video game Call of Duty: Vanguard is a second lieutenant with two Victoria Crosses fighting in Africa.

See also
New Zealand's Top 100 History Makers

Notes

References

Biography in 1966 Encyclopaedia of New Zealand
Second Lieutenant C.H. Upham in The Art of War exhibition at The National Archives (United Kingdom)

Further reading 

 Scott, T. (2020). Searching For Charlie: In Pursuit of the Real Charles Upham VC & Bar. Auckland: Upstart Press Ltd.

External links

Charles Upham visiting 5th New Zealand Scout Jamboree 1969 (photo)
Charles Upham visiting Upham Subcamp at 5th New Zealand Scout Jamboree 1969 (photo)
Charles Upham visiting Upham Subcamp at 5th New Zealand Scout Jamboree 1969 (photo)

1908 births
1994 deaths
Burials at St Paul's Cemetery, Christchurch
Prisoners of war held at Colditz Castle
Hurunui District
Lincoln University (New Zealand) alumni
New Zealand Army officers
New Zealand farmers
New Zealand military personnel of World War II
New Zealand prisoners of war in World War II
New Zealand World War II recipients of the Victoria Cross
People educated at Christ's College, Christchurch
People from Christchurch
Recipients of the Order of Honour (Greece)
Recipients of the Victoria Cross
World War II prisoners of war held by Germany
Military personnel from Christchurch
Brittan family